The Candlemaker is a 1956 animated short film directed by John Halas and Joy Batchelor for the United Lutheran Church in America. The story is about a candlemaker and his son at Christmas time.

Synopsis
A candlemaker delivers candles to faraway customers, leaving his son Tom to produce candles for the church's Christmas services. Tom forgets about his duty and rushes to deliver the candle on time, and the Christmas services are poorly lit. The next day, Tom prepares a new candle, demonstrating the values of responsibility and Christian stewardship.

See also
 List of Christmas films

References

External links
 

1956 films
1956 animated films
1956 short films
1950s animated short films
1950s Christmas films
Animated Christmas films
British animated fantasy films
British Christmas films
Christian animation
British animated short films
Halas and Batchelor films
Films directed by John Halas
1950s English-language films
1950s British films